"Where Do You Come From" is a song first recorded by Elvis Presley as part of the soundtrack for his 1962 motion picture Girls! Girls! Girls!.

It was subsequently rejected for use in the motion picture and did not appear in the film, but was included on its soundtrack album Girls! Girls! Girls!.

History

Writing 
The song was published by Elvis Presley Music, Inc. It was written by Ruth Bachelor and Bob Roberts.

Recording 
Elvis Presley recorded "Where Do You Come From" on March 27, 1962 — during his March 26-28 soundtrack recordings for the Paramount motion picture Girls! Girls! Girls! at the Radio Recorders studio in Hollywood, California.

Release 
The song was released on a single as a flip side to "Return to Sender" in October 1962. "Where Do You Come From" peaked at number 99 on the Billboard Hot 100, while "Return to Sender" peaked at number 2. The title "Return to Sender" was certified Gold in the United States for selling a million copies.

Musical style and lyrics 
Billboard in 1962 called the song a "croon ballad".

According to the book Elvis Films FAQ, it is a "slow, aching ballad" that "starts a bit like "As Long As I Have You"."

Charts

References

External links 
 Elvis Presley with The Jordanaires – U.S. Male / Stay Away at Discogs

1962 songs
1962 singles
1960s ballads
Elvis Presley songs
RCA Records singles